Situation Sthlm is a street newspaper sold by homeless people in Stockholm, Sweden.  It was founded in 1995, and was Sweden's only street newspaper until Faktum and Aluma were founded early in the 2000s.

In 2006 it was awarded the grand prize of Publicistklubben (Swedish Publicists' Association) together with its sister papers Faktum and Aluma.

References

External links
Situation Sthlm

1995 establishments in Sweden
Newspapers published in Stockholm
Publications established in 1995
Street newspapers